Shirley Bellinger,  played by Kathryn Erbe in the HBO series Oz, is a fictional character who was first presented in the related book OZ: Behind These Walls: The Journal of Augustus Hill. She is based on child murderer Susan Smith.

Character overview
"Prisoner 97B642. Convicted December 6, 1997 - Murder in the first degree. Sentence: Death. Sentence commuted in 1999, then commutation of sentence revoked in 2000."

Shirley Bellinger is the first and only woman to be incarcerated at Oswald. She was sentenced to die for murdering her daughter; she drove her car into a lake with her daughter in the back seat, then swam out as the car sank, leaving her daughter to drown. She swears it was an accident, but that it nevertheless "had to happen".

While she keeps mostly to herself and has a shy, charming demeanor, she shows some signs of psychological instability; shortly after her arrival, she exposes herself to fellow prisoner Timmy Kirk and prostitutes herself to inmates and guards alike in return for preferential treatment. She believes she is doing God's will, and it is suggested that she is a devout Christian.

Along with James Robson, Bellinger is one of two regulars who do not live in Emerald City.

Fictional history

Season 2
Bellinger arrives on Death Row and comments on how "comfortable" her new home is to Warden Glynn.  While on Death Row, she flashes her vulva to Timmy Kirk who is on mop duty.  Father Mukada visits Bellinger on Death Row in an effort to see her state of mind.  She opens up to Mukada about how she was not a religious person growing up and that her first husband was Jewish and her second husband Zeke was an atheist.  She then makes a pass at Mukada by commenting on how his collar is on too tight.  Mukada gets nervous and immediately tells her to stop.  She then breaks down and cries.  Later, she sees Diane Wittlesey pass on through.  Bellinger asks Wittlesey to be her friend and is rejected, and Wittlesey asks Bellinger how she could live with herself after what she has done.  Bellinger replies that she did what she had to do and that she is able to sleep.  She then puts her hand on Wittlesey's hand in a gesture of sympathy.  She exchanges a series of pornographic letters with a "secret admirer" from within her cell block. When her pen pal turns out to be fellow inmate Simon Adebisi, who exposes himself to her and demands fellatio, she rejects him because he is Black, sending him off with a racial slur.

Season 3
Bellinger is joined by Richie Hanlon.  She asks him to expose himself to her and does not care if he is a homosexual. Bellinger and Hanlon grow close, and she is seen making a sweater for him.  When Bellinger sees Hanlon and Vernon Schillinger get into a growling match, she gets worried and asks Hanlon why the two men hate each other.  Hanlon explains that Schillinger is the reason he is on death row.  Willing to help Hanlon, she tells him to go to the judge and say that both he and Schillinger killed Alexander Vogel together.  Before Hanlon goes to see the judge, they say their goodbyes.  Before lights out, she sees an empty cell and assumes that Hanlon got his death sentence overturned.  She unknits the sweater she made for him, realizing she will never see him again.

Bellinger loses her final appeal and is apparently at peace with her impending death. She enlists the help of Tim McManus, who tells her Hanlon has been murdered and promises he will find out who did it. Bellinger chooses hanging as her method of execution. She tells McManus that she's on his side of the sexual harassment suit against Claire Howell.

Soon afterward, however, she learns that she is pregnant by an unknown partner. As prison psychologist "Sister Pete" Reimondo examines her, Bellinger tells the nun why she killed her daughter: she saw "orbs of fire" surrounding her and even saw a plate levitate. Bellinger insists that she has to die. Sister Pete recommends to Governor James Devlin that Bellinger be institutionalized, and Devlin then commutes Bellinger's death sentence to life imprisonment without the possibility of parole.  Furious, Bellinger tells Reimondo that the nun betrayed her and demands an abortion, or she will kill "this monster inside of me". As Sister Pete is telling Bellinger she will be sent to the Connelly Institute for the Criminally Insane and will be under 24-hour watch, Bellinger screams that Satan fathered her child, and she is "the Virgin Mother".

Season 4
After miscarrying the baby under mysterious circumstances, Bellinger returns to Oz.  As she is walking on death row, she notices that there are three new inmates and one of them is in her old cell. She asks inmate Nat Ginzburg if he will switch cells with her; he declines.  She begins to have sex with guard Len Lopresti.

As her execution date nears, Bellinger's ex-husband, Zeke, visits her and offers forgiveness. Angered, she tells him she killed their daughter because she was raped by Zeke's father and Katie was actually Zeke's half-sister. Furious, Zeke punches her in the face, knocking out a tooth.

Her execution date arrives, and she assures everyone around her she is ready to die. She talks to Moses Deyell and Ginzburg one last time, telling them she woke up with a crick in her neck and her final meal was a SlimFast milkshake. As Warden Leo Glynn and Father Ray Mukada arrive, she tells Glynn that Lopresti comes into her cell every night and has sex with her (which Lopresti denies) and tells Mukada that the father of her child is Satan in the form of a man. Mukada asks which man, but Bellinger cryptically replies, "neither rain nor snow". Mukada recognizes this as a part of the motto of the U.S. Postal Service, and suspects Aryan leader Vernon Schillinger is the father because he is in charge of the mail service in Oz. Schillinger denies it, however.

As she is led to the gallows, however, her survival instinct kicks in, and she violently resists her guards, begging not to be hanged. She is eventually subdued and executed as planned.

Later in the series, her character appears as a ghost and narrates an episode of season 6.

Murders committed

 Katie Bellinger - Drove through a river, then Shirley swam out the water and left her daughter to drown in the sinking car.

Analysis
Merri Lisa Johnson discusses the character's relationships in Third Wave Feminism and Television.  Johnson writes:

References

External links
Character Biography

Oz (TV series) characters
Fictional characters based on real people
Fictional female murderers
Fictional filicides
Fictional murderers of children
Fictional people executed by hanging
Fictional people executed for murder
Fictional victims of domestic abuse
Fictional victims of sexual assault
Television characters introduced in 1997